Velvet Empire is the only full album by the Canadian pop band Velvet Empire. The album contains the band's popular single "Frontin' on Me", but was not as commercially successful as hoped and the group disbanded shortly after the release.

The album contains several features for use on a home computer and includes a behind-the-scenes video, images and lyrics.

Track listing
 "Are You Ready?... Then Let's Begin" - 0:21
 "Frontin' on Me" - 3:32
 "I" - 3:40
 "Wha, Wha, What" - 3:02
 "Mad for You" - 3:34
 "Tell Me" - 4:19
 "Now You Don't" - 3:36
 "Ride" - 3:55
 "Good Girls" - 3:49
 "About Last Night" - 3:35
 "2 A.M." - 4:12
 "That's Right" - 3:55
 "Wild Horses" - 5:12

2002 debut albums